Festuca lucida is a species of grass in the family Poaceae. It is native in West Himalaya. It is a perennial and mainly grows in temperate biomes. This species was first described in 1896.

References

lucida